The Swimming competition in the 2009 Asian Youth Games was held in the Singapore Sports School in Singapore between 2 and 6 July 2009. Each country was limited to having 6 boys and 6 girls compete during the entire competition.

Medalists

Boys

Girls

Medal table

Results

Boys

50 m freestyle
4–5 July

100 m freestyle
5–6 July

200 m freestyle
3 July

400 m freestyle
2 July

50 m backstroke
5–6 July

100 m backstroke
2–3 July

200 m backstroke
4 July

50 m breaststroke
2–3 July

100 m breaststroke
3–4 July

200 m breaststroke
6 July

50 m butterfly
3–4 July

100 m butterfly
4–5 July

200 m butterfly
2 July

200 m individual medley
5 July

4 × 100 m freestyle relay
3 July

4 × 100 m medley relay
5 July

Girls

50 m freestyle
4–5 July

100 m freestyle
5–6 July

200 m freestyle
3 July

400 m freestyle
2 July

50 m backstroke
5–6 July

100 m backstroke
2–3 July

200 m backstroke
4 July

50 m breaststroke
2–3 July

100 m breaststroke
3–4 July

200 m breaststroke
6 July

50 m butterfly
3–4 July

100 m butterfly
4–5 July

200 m butterfly
2 July

200 m individual medley
5 July

4 × 100 m freestyle relay
6 July

4 × 100 m medley relay
4 July

References

Results

External links
 Official site

2009 Asian Youth Games events
Asian Youth Games
2009